Rupal is a town and former princely state in Gujarat, western India.

History 
Rupal was a Fifth Class princely state, comprising twelve more villages, covering sixteen square miles in Mahi Kantha, It has been deprived of its jurisdiction as taluka due to maladministration.

It had a combined population of 3,113 in 1901, yielding a state revenue of 7,045 Rupees (1903-4, half from land), paying tributes of 1,165 Rupees to the Gaikwar Baroda State and 362 Rupees to Idar State.

External links and sources 

 Imperial Gazetteer on DSAL - Mahi Kantha

Princely states of Gujarat
Rajput princely states